Anatrachyntis vanharteni is a moth in the family Cosmopterigidae. It was described by Koster in 2010. It is found in the United Arab Emirates.

References

Moths described in 2010
Anatrachyntis
Moths of Asia